On the Road is the name given to The String Cheese Incident's taping project that exhaustively documents almost all of their live concerts and presents a refined version of each show's soundboard matrix mix in a three-disc set (also occasionally two or four, depending on a show's length). Starting with their spring 2002 tour, the band has released nearly every concert they have played through their independent record label, SCI Fidelity. At first, the CDs were encased in cardboard folding cases. Starting with the summer 2003 tour, the band switched to multiple-capacity jewel cases, and after a brief run in Denver in early 2004, all shows thereafter have been released exclusively online in both MP3 and FLAC formats, with only a few shows per tour being chosen for release on compact disc.

The band's live output and sales are both so prolific among loyal fans that they recently created a website to separate the sales of online-only shows from shows still available on disc.

External links
 SCI On the Road
 Live Cheese

The String Cheese Incident albums
Live album series
2000s live albums